Fardis     is a small village the  Hasbaya District in Lebanon.

History
In 1838, during the Ottoman era, Eli Smith noted the  population of Fardis as Druze and "Greek" Christians.

In 1852 Edward Robinson noted it as a village on the road between Rachaya Al Foukhar and Hasbaya, located directly east of Kaukaba.

In 1875, Victor Guérin noted it as small village, inhabited by    "Schismatic Greek" and Druse.

Modern era
In 1988, when the :no:Norbatt part of UNIFIL was stationed there, the village had 500 inhabitants, all Druze.

References

Bibliography

External links
 Fardis, Localiban

Populated places in Hasbaya District
Druze communities in Lebanon